Balireddy Prudhviraj (born August 6, 1964) is an Indian actor and politician who appears in Telugu films. Known for his comic roles, he has acted in over 100 films. He is noted for his dialogue of 30 Years Industry in the 2002 film Khadgam, which also became his moniker.

In February 2019, he was appointed as state secretary to YSR Congress Party of Andhra Pradesh. He worked as chairman of SVBC TV channel run by Tirumala Tirupati Devasthanams until January 2020.

Career 
Prudhviraj was born in Tadepalligudem, West Godavari District, Andhra Pradesh. He was introduced by famous Dr. Prabakar Reddy and E. V. V. Satyanarayana in their first film Aa Okkati Adakku (1992). During this film he spent forty days with Rao Gopala Rao, where he learnt about the film industry. He played many roles in about 100 films. He was well recognized for his dialogue "30 Years Industry ikkada" in Krishna Vamsi's film Khadgam (2002) and this film changed his fate. From November 2022 Prudhviraj is doing Political Battayilu setirical show in Prime 9 News, Written and directed by Vijaya Nagesh. In the year 2022, he joined Jana Sena Party

Controversy

He has been nominated as chairman of Sri Venkateswara Bhakti Channel in 2019. In January 2020, his audiotape recording with a female employee of SVBC TV channel went viral on YouTube and SVBC employees protested urging him to resign from his post as the chairman of the channel. Following that incident Prudhviraj resigned as chairman of Sri Venkateswara Bhakti Channel.

Filmography

Notes

References

External links
 
 Chithr.com

Telugu comedians
Telugu male actors
Living people
1964 births
Santosham Film Awards winners
People from West Godavari district
Andhra Pradesh politicians
Male actors from Andhra Pradesh
Indian male comedians
Indian comedians
Indian male film actors
Indian male actors
Male actors in Telugu cinema
Male actors in Telugu television